Jaroslav Průšek (1906–1980) was a Czech sinologist. He was considered as the founder of the Prague School of Sinology.  He trained as an historian, with an interest in the history of ancient Greece, Byzantium and Roman Empire at Charles University. After graduating from Charles University, he went to Germany and Sweden and became the student of Bernard Karlgren. He was sent to China and Japan in the 1930s, where he became friends with many Chinese intellectuals, including Lu Xun. He went back to Czechoslovakia in 1937. In 1952, he was appointed head of Institute of East Asian Studies of Charles University.

He was a pioneer in a range of topics ranging from Song dynasty vernacular literature and modern Chinese literature. He lived in what Leo Ou-fan Lee called "the era of giants."

Selected works

Books  
Dictionary of Oriental Literature
The lyrical and the epic: studies of modern Chinese literature
Chinese history and literature: collection of studies
Chinese states and the northern barbarians in the period 1400-300 B.C
The origins and the authors of the hua-pen 
Die Literatur des befreiten China und ihre Volkstraditionen
Études d'histoire et de littérature chinoises offertes au professeur Jaroslav Průšek
My sister China, His memoir about his experiences in China.
Three sketches of Chinese literature

Articles

References and further reading 
 
 
 -- , "The Legacies of Jaroslav Průšek and C.T.Hsia," in David Der-wei Wang, ed., New Literary History of Modern China (Cambridge, MA: Harvard University Press, 2017), pp. 644- 650,  
 Xiaoqing Diana Lin, "Jaroslav Průšek: Communism, Modernization, and Chinese Literary Studies During the Cold War, 1950s−1960s," in Michael  Brose and Antonina Luszczykiewicz eds., Sinology During the Cold War (Abingdon, Oxon.; NY: Routledge; 2022),
  Open access online, includes extensive bibliography.

Notes

External links
 .  Podcast of a talk exploring how much preconceived notions about Chinese poetry conditioned their understanding of Chinese literature, and to what extent they helped them arrive at a breakthrough in Chinese literature studies.

1906 births
1980 deaths
Czech sinologists
Charles University alumni
Chinese–Czech translators